Haylie McCleney (born July 11, 1994) is an American professional softball outfielder. She played college softball for Alabama. She represented the United States at the 2020 Summer Olympics and won a silver medal. She most recently played in the Athletes Unlimited Softball league.

Career
McCleney played college softball for Alabama from 2013 to 2016, earning Second Team and three First Team All-SEC honors. She was also named a Second Team and three First Team All-American from the National Fastpitch Coaches Association. McCleney would end her career with the Alabama career batting crown and a member of the elite .400 average, 300 hits, 200 runs, 100 stolen bases club. 

She played in the inaugural season of Athletes Unlimited Softball league.

International career
McCleney has been a member of the United States women's national softball team since 2013. She represented Team USA at the 2020 Summer Olympics and won a silver medal. She led Team USA in batting average, batting .529 throughout the 2020 Olympics with nine hits and four runs in six games, her hits leading the tournament. Team USA was defeated by Team Japan in the gold medal game 2–0, where she was shutout at the plate. Following the tournament, she was named to the WBSC All-Olympic softball team.

Personal life
McCleney is engaged to former Florida State softball pitcher Kylee Hanson. They were engaged in February 2019.

Statistics

References

External links
https://www.teamusa.org/usa-softball/athletes/Haylie-McCleney

1994 births
Living people
Competitors at the 2022 World Games
World Games gold medalists
World Games medalists in softball
Lesbian sportswomen
LGBT people from Alabama
American LGBT sportspeople
LGBT softball players
People from Jefferson County, Alabama
Alabama Crimson Tide softball players
Softball players from Alabama
Olympic softball players of the United States
Pan American Games medalists in softball
Pan American Games gold medalists for the United States
Softball players at the 2019 Pan American Games
Medalists at the 2019 Pan American Games
Softball players at the 2015 Pan American Games
Softball players at the 2020 Summer Olympics
Medalists at the 2020 Summer Olympics
Olympic silver medalists for the United States in softball
Olympic medalists in softball